Sinan Özkan (born 22 March 1986) is a Turkish footballer who plays for Serik Belediyespor.

Career
Born in Saint-Étienne, Özkan began his career playing youth football for the French team AS Saint-Étienne. He moved to Turkey and played for Türk Telekom Gençlik Spor Kulübü, Samsunspor, Manisaspor, Fethiyespor, Giresunspor, Tokatspor and Elazığspor. He has made seven Turkish Süper Lig appearances for Manisaspor and one appearance for Elazığspor.

References

External links

Guardian's Stats Centre

1986 births
Living people
Turkish footballers
French people of Turkish descent
Turkey under-21 international footballers
Samsunspor footballers
Manisaspor footballers
Giresunspor footballers
Konyaspor footballers
Adana Demirspor footballers
Alanyaspor footballers
Göztepe S.K. footballers
Gaziantep F.K. footballers
Fethiyespor footballers
Tokatspor footballers
Elazığspor footballers
Altay S.K. footballers
Sakaryaspor footballers
Süper Lig players
TFF First League players
TFF Second League players
Association football wingers